Dale End is a hamlet in Derbyshire, England to the west of Elton.

References 

Towns and villages of the Peak District
Hamlets in Derbyshire
Derbyshire Dales